Mebo may refer to:
Mebo Telecommunications
MV Mebo II, Dutch freighter
Mebo, Arunachal Pradesh, Tehsil in Arunachal Pradesh, India
MèBo, a large robotic toy